National Insurance Company Limited (NICL) is a central public sector undertaking under the ownership of the Ministry of Finance, Government of India. It is headquartered at Kolkata and was established in 1906 by Gordhandas Dutia and Jeevan Das Dutia. National Insurance company and Asian Insurance company was nationalised in 1972. Its portfolio consists of a multitude of general insurance policies, offered to a wide arena of clients encompassing different sectors of the economy. Apart from being a leading insurance provider in India, NICL also serves in Nepal.

History
After nationalisation in 1972, NICL operated as a subsidiary of General Insurance Corporation of India (GIC).
National Insurance Company Limited was spun off as a distinct company under the General Insurance Business (Nationalisation) Amendment Act in 2002. In April 2004, NIC signed an agreement with Nainital Bank for distribution of its general insurance products through the bank's branches in Uttarakhand, Haryana and New Delhi.

Company profile
National Insurance Company Limited was incorporated on 5 December 1906 with its registered office in Kolkata. Consequent to passing of the General Insurance Business Nationalisation Act in 1972, 21 Foreign and 11 Indian Companies were merged with it and National became a subsidiary of General Insurance Corporation of India (GIC) which is fully owned by the Government of India. After the notification of the General Insurance Business and its India's largest General Insurance Company(Nationalisation) Amendment Act, on 7 August 2002, National has been de-linked from its holding company GIC and presently operates as an independent insurance company wholly owned by Govt of India.
National Insurance Company Ltd (NIC) is one of the public sector insurance companies of India. It transacts a non-life insurance business. Headquartered in Kolkata, NIC's network of about 2000 offices is spread over the country. NIC's foreign operations are carried out from its branch offices in Nepal. The paid-up share capital of National is 1 billion. Starting off with a premium base of 50 crores in 1974, NIC's gross direct premium income has steadily grown to about 160 billion rupees in the financial year 2017–18.
National transacts general insurance business of Fire, Marine and Miscellaneous insurance.
As of 2010, NICL has a AAA rating from Indian rating agency, CRISIL, a subsidiary of Standard and Poor's Company.
The gross premiums from underwriting by the company grew by 32.22% to over 61 billion during the Financial Year 2010–2011. And Gross Premium grew up to 100 billion during the financial year 2013–2014. With this, the company was ranked second among general insurance companies operating in India, behind New India Assurance, at the end of the 2014 Financial Year.
With about 2000 offices and approximately 11,000 employees and many more agents, the company operates in all of India, and neighbouring Nepal.
In 2008, the company signed a deal with HCL Technologies worth almost 4 billion to outsource the company's information technology requirements over 7 years. On the 2nd of February 2018, the Government of India announced the merger of National Insurance Company Limited with United India Insurance Company and Oriental Insurance.

Products and services
NICL has a range of coverage policies targeting different sectors:
 Personal Insurance policies include medical insurance, accident, property and auto insurance coverage
 Rural Insurance policies provide protection against natural and climatic disasters for agriculture and rural businesses
 Industrial Insurance policies provide coverage for the project, construction, contracts, fire, equipment loss, theft, etc.
 Commercial Insurance policies provide protection against loss and damage of property during transportation, transactions, etc.

References

Financial services companies established in 1906
Companies based in Kolkata
General insurance companies of India
Government-owned insurance companies of India
Companies nationalised by the Government of India
Indian companies established in 1906
2018 mergers and acquisitions